Honeysett is a surname. Notable people with the surname include:
John Honeysett (1938–2018), English greyhound trainer
Martin Honeysett (1943–2015), English cartoonist and illustrator
Troy Honeysett, Australian actor

See also
Laurence Cane-Honeysett, British musician and journalist